Fulton John Sheen (born Peter John Sheen, May 8, 1895 – December 9, 1979) was an American bishop of the Catholic Church known for his preaching and especially his work on television and radio. Ordained a priest of the Diocese of Peoria in 1919, Sheen quickly became a renowned theologian, earning the Cardinal Mercier Prize for International Philosophy in 1923. He went on to teach theology and philosophy at the Catholic University of America as well as acting as a parish priest before being appointed auxiliary bishop of the Archdiocese of New York in 1951. He held this position until 1966 when he was made the Bishop of Rochester. He resigned in 1969 as his 75th birthday approached, and was made archbishop of the titular see of Newport, Wales.

For 20 years as "Father Sheen", later monsignor, he hosted the night-time radio program The Catholic Hour on NBC (1930–1950) before moving to television and presenting Life Is Worth Living (1952–1957). Sheen's final presenting role was on the syndicated The Fulton Sheen Program (1961–1968) with a format very similar to that of the earlier Life is Worth Living show. For this work, Sheen twice won an Emmy Award for Most Outstanding Television Personality, and was featured on the cover of Time magazine. Starting in 2009, his shows were being re-broadcast on the EWTN and the Trinity Broadcasting Network's Church Channel cable networks. Due to his contribution to televised preaching, Sheen is often referred to as one of the first televangelists.

The cause for his canonization was officially opened in 2002. In June 2012, Pope Benedict XVI officially recognized a decree from the Congregation for the Causes of Saints stating that he lived a life of "heroic virtues" – a major step towards beatification – and he is now referred to as "venerable". On July 5, 2019, Pope Francis approved a reputed miracle that occurred through the intercession of Sheen, clearing the way for his beatification. Sheen was scheduled to be beatified in Peoria on December 21, 2019, but the beatification was postponed after the current Bishop of Rochester expressed concern that Sheen's handling of a 1963 sexual misconduct case against a priest might be cited unfavorably in a forthcoming report from the New York Attorney General. The Diocese of Peoria countered that Sheen's handling of the case had already been "thoroughly examined" and "exonerated" and that Sheen had "never put children in harm's way".

Childhood

Sheen was born in El Paso, Illinois, the oldest of four sons of Newton and Delia Sheen. His parents were of Irish descent and their own parents were from Croghan, County Roscommon, Connacht. Though he was known as "Fulton", his mother's maiden name, he was baptized as "Peter John Sheen". As an infant, Sheen contracted tuberculosis. After the family moved to nearby Peoria, Illinois, Sheen's first role in the Church was as an altar boy at St. Mary's Cathedral.

Education
After earning high school valedictorian honors at Spalding Institute in Peoria, Peoria County, Illinois, in 1913, Sheen was educated at St. Viator College in Bourbonnais, Kankakee County, Illinois, and attended Saint Paul Seminary in Minnesota before his ordination on September 20, 1919. He continued studies at the Catholic University of America in Washington, District of Columbia. He celebrated his first Christmas Mass at St. Mark Parish in Peoria, Illinois, which remains the only altar in the Peoria area where he held a Mass. His youthful appearance was still evident on one occasion when a local priest asked Sheen to assist as altar boy during the celebration of the Mass.

Sheen completed a pair of doctoral degrees. He became fluent in French, and earned a Doctor of Philosophy at the Catholic University of Leuven in Belgium in 1923. His thesis was titled "The Spirit of Contemporary Philosophy and the Finite God". While at Leuven, he became the first American ever to win the Cardinal Mercier Prize for the best philosophical treatise. In 1924 Sheen pursued further studies in Rome, earning a Sacred Theology Doctorate at the Pontificium Collegium Internationale Angelicum, the future Pontifical University of Saint Thomas Aquinas, Angelicum.

Priestly life
Sheen was the assistant to the pastor at St. Patrick's Church, Soho Square in London for a year, while teaching theology at St. Edmund's College, Ware, where he met Ronald Knox. Although Oxford and Columbia wanted him to teach philosophy, in 1926 Bishop Edmund Dunne of the Roman Catholic Diocese of Peoria, Illinois, asked Sheen to take over St. Patrick's parish. After nine months, Dunne returned him to the Catholic University of America, where he taught philosophy until 1950.

In 1929, Sheen gave a speech at the National Catholic Educational Association. He encouraged teachers to "educate for a Catholic Renaissance" in the United States. Sheen was hoping that Catholics would become more influential in their country through education, which would help attract others to the faith. He believed that Catholics should "integrate" their faith into the rest of their daily life.

Bishop and archbishop
Sheen was consecrated a bishop on June 11, 1951, and served as an auxiliary bishop of the Archdiocese of New York from 1951 to 1966. The principal consecrator was the Discalced Carmelite Cardinal Adeodato Giovanni Piazza, the Cardinal-Bishop of Sabina e Poggio Mirteto and the Secretary of the Sacred Consistorial Congregation (what is today the Congregation for Bishops). The co-consecrators were Archbishop Leone Giovanni Battista Nigris, Titular Archbishop of Philippi and the Secretary of the Congregation for the Propagation of the Faith (what is today the Congregation for the Evangelization of Peoples); and Archbishop Martin John O'Connor, Titular Archbishop of Laodicea in Syria and President Emeritus of the Pontifical Council for Social Communications.

In 1966, Sheen was made the Bishop of Rochester. He served in this position from October 21, 1966, to October 6, 1969, when he resigned and was made the archbishop of the titular see of Newport, Wales.

Ecumenical efforts
In the 1950s and 1960s, Sheen was notable for early efforts seeking common ground with Christians from non-Roman churches, whether Eastern or Protestant. He occasionally celebrated Byzantine Divine Liturgy, with papal permission awarding him certain bi-ritual faculties. He often commended Protestant devotion to Bible study: "The first subject of all to be studied is Scripture, and this demands not only the reading of it but the study of commentaries. ... Protestant commentaries, I discovered, were also particularly interesting because Protestants have spent more time on Scripture than most of us." His autobiography summarized his ecumenical outlook: "The combination of travel, the study of world religions and personal encounter with different nationalities and peoples made me see that the fullness of truth is like a complete circle of 360 degrees. Every religion in the world has a segment of that truth."

Media career

Radio
A popular instructor, Sheen wrote the first of 73 books in 1925, and in 1930 began a weekly NBC Sunday-night radio broadcast, The Catholic Hour. Sheen called World War II not only a political struggle, but also a "theological one". He referred to Hitler as an example of the "Anti-Christ". Two decades later, the broadcast had a weekly listening audience of four million people. Time referred to him in 1946 as "the golden-voiced Msgr. Fulton J. Sheen, U.S. Catholicism's famed proselytizer", and reported that his radio broadcast received 3,000–6,000 letters weekly from listeners. During the middle of this era, he narrated the first religious service broadcast on the new medium of television, putting in motion a new avenue for his religious pursuits.

Television

While at the Catholic University of America, Sheen provided voice-over commentary for an Easter Sunday Mass in 1940 that was one of the first televised religious services. During the sermon, telecast on experimental station W2XBS, Sheen remarked: "This is the first religious television in the history of the world. Let therefore its first message be a tribute of thanks to God for giving the minds of our day the inspiration to unravel the secrets of the universe."

On February 12, 1952, he began a weekly television program on the DuMont Television Network, titled Life Is Worth Living. Filmed at the Adelphi Theatre in New York City, the program consisted of the unpaid Sheen simply speaking in front of a live audience without a script or cue cards, occasionally using a chalkboard.

The show, scheduled in a prime time slot on Tuesday nights at 8:00 p.m., was not expected to challenge the ratings giants Milton Berle and Frank Sinatra, but did surprisingly well. Berle, known to many early television viewers as "Uncle Miltie" and for using ancient vaudeville material, joked about Sheen, "He uses old material, too", and observed that "[i]f I'm going to be eased off the top by anyone, it's better that I lose to the One for whom Bishop Sheen is speaking." Sheen responded in jest that maybe people should start calling him "Uncle Fultie". Life and Time magazines ran feature stories on Bishop Sheen. The number of stations carrying Life Is Worth Living jumped from three to fifteen in less than two months. There was fan mail that flowed in at a rate of 8,500 letters per week. There were four times as many requests for tickets as could be fulfilled. Admiral, the sponsor, paid the production costs in return for a one-minute commercial at the show's opening and another minute at the close. In 1952, Sheen won an Emmy Award for his efforts, accepting the acknowledgment by saying, "I feel it is time I pay tribute to my four writers – Matthew, Mark, Luke and John." When Sheen won the Emmy, Berle quipped, "We both work for 'Sky Chief, a reference to Berle's sponsor Texaco. Time called him "the first 'televangelist and the Archdiocese of New York could not meet the demand for tickets.

One of his best-remembered presentations came in February 1953, when he forcefully denounced the Soviet regime of Joseph Stalin. Sheen gave a dramatic reading of the burial scene from Shakespeare's Julius Caesar, substituting the names of prominent Soviet leaders Stalin, Lavrenty Beria, Georgy Malenkov, and Andrey Vyshinsky for the original Caesar, Cassius, Marc Antony, and Brutus. He concluded by saying, "Stalin must one day meet his judgment." Days later, the dictator suffered a stroke, dying within the week.

Indeed, Sheen was often quick to rebuke what he considered wrongful conduct, as in his televised sermon "False Compassion" when he shouted: "There are sob sisters; there are the social slobberers who insist on compassion being shown to the muggers, to the dope fiends, to the throat slashers, to the beatniks, to the prostitutes, to the homosexuals, to the punks, so that today the decent man is practically off the reservation" – before clarifying the criticism and charging his viewers with the responsibility to "hate the sin ... and love the sinner."

The show ran until 1957, drawing as many as 30 million people weekly. In 1958, Sheen became national director of the Society for the Propagation of the Faith, serving for eight years before being appointed Bishop of the Diocese of Rochester, New York, on October 26, 1966. He also hosted a nationally syndicated series, The Fulton Sheen Program, from 1961 to 1968 (first in black and white and then in color). The format of this series was essentially the same as Life Is Worth Living.

International cassette tape ministry
In September 1974, the Archbishop of Washington asked Sheen to be the speaker for a retreat for diocesan priests at the Loyola Retreat House in Faulkner, Maryland. This was recorded on reel-to-reel tape, state of the art at the time.

Sheen requested that the recorded talks be produced for distribution. This was the first production of a worldwide cassette tape ministry called Ministr-O-Media. This nonprofit company operated on the grounds of St. Joseph's Parish, Pomfret, Maryland. The retreat album was titled Renewal and Reconciliation and included nine 60-minute audiotapes.

Evangelization
Sheen was credited with helping convert a number of notable figures to the Catholic faith, including agnostic writer Heywood Broun, politician Clare Boothe Luce, automaker Henry Ford II, communist writer Louis F. Budenz, communist organizer Bella Dodd, theatrical designer Jo Mielziner, violinist and composer Fritz Kreisler, and actress Virginia Mayo. Each conversion process took an average of 25 hours of lessons, and reportedly more than 95% of his students in private instruction were baptized.

Falling-out with Cardinal Spellman
According to the foreword written for a 2008 edition of Sheen's autobiography, Treasure in Clay: The Autobiography of Fulton J. Sheen, Catholic journalist Raymond Arroyo wrote why Sheen "retired" from hosting Life is Worth Living "at the height of its popularity ... [when] an estimated 30 million viewers and listeners tuned in each week." Arroyo wrote that "It is widely believed that Cardinal Spellman drove Sheen off the air."

Arroyo relates that: "In the late 1950s, the government donated millions of dollars' worth of powdered milk to the New York Archdiocese. In turn, Cardinal Spellman handed that milk over to the Society for the Propagation of the Faith to distribute to the poor of the world. On at least one occasion, he demanded that the director of the Society, Bishop Sheen, pay the Archdiocese for the donated milk. He wanted millions of dollars. Despite Cardinal Spellman's considerable powers of persuasion and influence in Rome, Sheen refused. These were funds donated by the public to the missions, funds Sheen himself had personally contributed to and raised over the airwaves. He felt an obligation to protect them, even from the itchy fingers of his own Cardinal."

Spellman later took the issue directly to Pope Pius XII, pleading his case with Sheen present. The Pope sided with Sheen. Spellman later confronted Sheen, stating, "I will get even with you. It may take six months or ten years, but everyone will know what you are like." Besides being pressured to leave television, Sheen also "found himself unwelcome in the churches of New York City. Spellman canceled Sheen's annual Good Friday sermons at St. Patrick's Cathedral and discouraged clergy from befriending the Bishop." In 1966, Spellman had Sheen reassigned to Rochester, New York, and caused his leadership at the Society for the Propagation of the Faith to be terminated (a position he had held for 16 years and raised hundreds of millions of dollars for, to which he had personally donated $10 million of his earnings). On December 2, 1967, Spellman died in New York City.

Sheen never talked about the situation, only making vague references to his "trials both inside and outside the Church." He even went so far as to praise Spellman in his autobiography.

Later years
While serving in Rochester, he created the Sheen Ecumenical Housing Foundation. He also spent some of his energy on political activities, such as his denunciation of the Vietnam War in late July 1967. On Ash Wednesday in 1967, Sheen decided to give St. Bridget's Parish building to the federal Housing and Urban Development program. Sheen wanted to let the government use it for black Americans. There was a protest since Sheen acted on his own accord. The pastor disagreed, saying that "There is enough empty property around without taking down the church and the school." The deal fell through.

On October 15, 1969, one month after celebrating his 50th anniversary as a priest, Sheen resigned from his Rochester position. He was then appointed archbishop of the titular see of Newport, Wales by Pope Paul VI. This ceremonial position gave him a promotion to archbishop and helped him continue his extensive writing. Sheen wrote 73 books and numerous articles and columns.

On October 2, 1979, two months before Sheen's death, Pope John Paul II visited St. Patrick's Cathedral in New York City and embraced Sheen, saying, "You have written and spoken well of the Lord Jesus Christ. You are a loyal son of the Church."

Death and legacy
Beginning in 1977, Sheen "underwent a series of surgeries that sapped his strength and even made preaching difficult". Throughout this time, he continued to work on his autobiography, parts of which "were recited from his sickbed as he clutched a crucifix". Soon after an open-heart surgery at Lenox Hill Hospital, Sheen died on December 9, 1979, in his private chapel while praying before the Blessed Sacrament. He was interred in the crypt of St. Patrick's Cathedral near the deceased archbishops of New York, including Cardinal Spellman. On June 27, 2019, the remains of Archbishop Fulton Sheen were transferred to The Cathedral of St. Mary in Peoria, IL, where his cause is being promoted for sainthood.

The official repository of Sheen's papers, television programs, and other materials is at St. Bernard's School of Theology and Ministry in Rochester, New York.

Joseph Campanella introduced the reruns of Sheen's various programs that are aired on EWTN. Reruns are also aired on the Trinity Broadcasting Network. In addition to his television appearances, Sheen can be heard on Relevant Radio.

The Fulton J. Sheen Museum, which is operated by the Roman Catholic Diocese of Peoria and located in Peoria, Illinois, houses the largest set of Sheen's personal items in five collections. The museum is located one block south of Cathedral of Saint Mary of the Immaculate Conception, where Sheen served as an altar boy, had his first communion and confirmation, was ordained and celebrated his first Mass. Another museum is located in Sheen's hometown of El Paso, Illinois. This museum contains various Sheen artifacts, but is not connected to the Diocese of Peoria.

The Sheen Center for Thought & Culture, located along Bleecker Street in Lower Manhattan, is named after him.

The actor Ramón Gerard Antonio Estévez adopted the stage name of Martin Sheen partly in admiration of the bishop.

Fulton Sheen did much of his preaching at Saint Agnes Church in Midtown Manhattan, from 1927 until his death in 1979. On October 7, 1980, New York Mayor Ed Koch renamed East 43rd Street in front of the church as "Archbishop Fulton J. Sheen Place".

Cause for canonization
The Archbishop Fulton J. Sheen Foundation was formed in 1998 by Gregory J. Ladd and Lawrence F. Hickey to make known the archbishop's life. The foundation approached Cardinal John O'Connor of the Archdiocese of New York for permission to commence the process of his cause, which was under the authority of the Diocese of Peoria. In 2002, Sheen's cause for canonization was officially opened by Bishop Daniel R. Jenky, C.S.C., of the Diocese of Peoria, and from then on Sheen was referred to as a "Servant of God". On February 2, 2008, the archives of Sheen were sealed at a ceremony during a special Mass at the Cathedral of Saint Mary of the Immaculate Conception in Peoria, Illinois, where the diocese was sponsoring his canonization. In 2009, the diocesan phase of the investigation came to an end, and the records were sent to the Congregation for the Causes of Saints at the Holy See in Rome.

On June 28, 2012, the Holy See announced officially that it had recognized Sheen's life as one of "heroic virtue", a major step towards eventual beatification. From this moment on, Sheen is styled "Venerable Servant of God". According to the Catholic News Service and The Catholic Post (the official newspaper of the Peoria Diocese), the case of a newborn boy who had no discernible pulse for 61 minutes (who was about to be declared dead at OSF Saint Francis Medical Center in Peoria, Illinois, as a stillborn infant) and yet lived to be healthy – without physical or mental impairment – was in the preliminary stages of being investigated as the possible miracle needed for Sheen's potential beatification. If the miracle is approved at the diocesan level, and then by the Congregation for the Causes of Saints at the Holy See (being both medically unexplainable and directly attributable theologically to Sheen's intercession according to expert panels in both subject areas), beatification may proceed. Another such miracle would be required for him to be considered for canonization.

On September 7, 2011, a tribunal of inquiry was sworn in to investigate the alleged healing. During a special Mass at 10:30 am on Sunday, December 11, 2011, at St. Mary's Cathedral in Peoria, the documentation gathered by the tribunal over nearly three months was boxed and sealed. It was then shipped to the Holy See for consideration by the Congregation for the Causes of Saints, concluding the diocesan tribunal's work.

On Sunday, September 9, 2012, a Mass of Thanksgiving and banquet was held at St. Mary's Cathedral and the Spalding Pastoral Center in celebration of the advancement of Archbishop Sheen's cause. Attendees included Bishop Daniel R. Jenky, C.S.C., and his predecessor as Bishop of Peoria, Archbishop John J. Myers of Newark, New Jersey, along with many clergy and religious from around the country. Copies of the positio, the book detailing the documentation behind his cause, were presented to Myers, representatives of the Church in other states, a delegate from the Archdiocese of Chicago, and other patrons and supporters of Sheen's cause. According to statements made during the service by clergy connected to the cause, the medical and theological study of the possible miracles needed for his beatification and canonization was well underway. At least one was being seriously considered. Due to new rules under Pope Benedict XVI stating that beatification should occur locally, ideally in the candidate's home diocese (which is usually but not always the diocese that sponsors the cause), it would likely take place in Peoria, the first there. Should he be beatified and canonized, he would be among a select few natives of the U.S. to hold that distinction.

Transfer of Sheen's remains
In September 2014, it was announced that the canonization cause would be suspended due to a disagreement with the Archdiocese of New York concerning the return of Sheen's remains to the Diocese of Peoria. In a press release on June 14, 2016, it was announced that Sheen's surviving family petitioned the New York Supreme Court to allow the transfer of Sheen's remains to Peoria. The press release stated that "on several occasions, the Archdiocese [of New York] has declared its desire to cooperate with the wishes of the family."

In an action brought in New York Supreme Court (the trial-level court in New York), on November 16, 2016, Justice Arlene P. Bluth ordered the Archdiocese of New York to grant permission to disinter Sheen's body. The court ruled that the archdiocese's objection that Sheen would not want the disinterment was without factual basis. Given that his elevation to sainthood was being blocked, the court found the family had sufficient justification for moving his body.

However, on February 6, 2018, the New York State Appellate Division overturned Bluth's decision, ordering an evidentiary hearing be held as to whether moving Sheen's body would be consistent with his wishes. The court noted, "[I]t is unclear if Archbishop Sheen's direction in his will to be buried in 'Calvary Cemetery, the official cemetery of the Archdiocese of New York' evinces an express intention to remain buried in the Archdiocese of New York, or was merely a descriptive term for Calvary Cemetery." However, after re-examining the case and holding the evidentiary hearing on June 9, 2018, Bluth affirmed her earlier ruling. The archdiocese had allowed Peoria to begin the work on his cause for canonization, which eventually would have required at the least a collection of his relics.

The Archdiocese of New York announced on June 9, 2019, that it was officially giving up the fight to keep Sheen's remains under the altar at St. Patrick's Cathedral in New York. On June 27, 2019, the remains were transferred to St. Mary's Cathedral in Peoria.

Miracle recognized for beatification
On July 6, 2019, the Congregation for the Causes of Saints promulgated the decree approving Sheen's miracle needed for beatification. The miracle involves the unexplained recovery of James Fulton Engstrom, a boy stillborn in September 2010 to Bonnie and Travis Engstrom of the Peoria-area town of Goodfield. Engstrom's parents prayed for the intercession of Sheen for their son's recovery. Pope Francis approved the miracle, and Sheen was scheduled for beatification on December 21, 2019, at the Cathedral of St. Mary in Peoria.

Postponement of beatification
On December 3, 2019, the Diocese of Peoria announced that the Holy See had decided on December 2 that Sheen's beatification would be "postponed". The postponement was prompted by Salvatore Matano, Bishop of Rochester, who expressed concern that his predecessor's handling of a 1963 sexual misconduct case against a priest might be cited unfavorably in a forthcoming report from New York State Attorney General Letitia James. The Diocese of Peoria countered that Sheen's handling of the case had already been "thoroughly examined" and "exonerated" and that Sheen had "never put children in harm's way." As of late 2022, the Attorney General's Rochester investigation was still ongoing, and the Holy See has not announced when or if the beatification will move ahead.

Selected books authored
God and Intelligence in Modern Philosophy (1925, Longmans, Green, and Co.)
The Seven Last Words (1933, The Century Co.)
Philosophy of Science (1934, Bruce Publishing Co.)
The Eternal Galilean (1934, Appleton-Century-Crofts)
Calvary and the Mass (1936, P. J. Kenedy & Sons)
The Cross and the Beatitudes (1937, P. J. Kenedy & Sons)
Seven Words of Jesus and Mary (1945, P. J. Kenedy & Sons)
Communism and the Conscience of the West (1948, Bobbs-Merrill)
Peace of Soul (1949, McGraw–Hill)
Three to Get Married (1951, Appleton-Century-Crofts)
The World's First Love (1952, McGraw-Hill)
Life Is Worth Living Series 1–5 (1953–1957, McGraw–Hill)
Way to Happiness (1953, Maco Magazine)
Way to Inner Peace (1955, Garden City Books)
Life of Christ (1958, McGraw–Hill)
Missions and the World Crisis (1963, Bruce Publishing Co.)
The Power of Love (1965, Simon & Schuster)
Footprints in a Darkened Forest (1967, Meredith Press)
Lenten and Easter Inspirations (1967, Maco Ecumenical Books)
Treasure in Clay: The Autobiography of Fulton J. Sheen (1980, Doubleday & Co.)
Finding True Happiness (2014, Dynamic Catholic)
Your Life is Worth Living: 50 Lessons to Deepen Your Faith, Foreword by Bishop Robert Barron (2019, Image Catholic Books)

References

Further reading
 Farney, Kirk D. (2022). Ministers of a New Medium: Broadcasting Theology in the Radio Ministries of Fulton J. Sheen and Walter A. Maier. IVP Academic
 Reeves, Thomas C. (2001). America's Bishop: The Life and Times of Fulton J. Sheen. Encounter Books, San Francisco.
 Riley, Kathleen L. (2004). Fulton J. Sheen: An American Catholic Response to the Twentieth Century. St. Paul's/Alba House, Staten Island.
 Sherwood, Timothy H. (2010). The Preaching of Archbishop Fulton J. Sheen: The Gospel Meets the Cold War. Lexington Books.
 Sherwood, Timothy H. (2013). The Rhetorical Leadership of Fulton J. Sheen, Norman Vincent Peale, and Billy Graham in the Age of Extremes. Lexington Books.
 Winsboro, Irvin D. S. & Epple, Michael (Summer 2009). "Religion, Culture, and the Cold War: Bishop Fulton J. Sheen and America's Anti-Communist Crusade of the 1950s", Historian, 71 (2): 209–233.

External links

The Archbishop Fulton John Sheen Foundation
Library Catalog Record for Sheen's Ph.D. thesis 
FBI file on Bishop Sheen
Venerable Fulton J. Sheen: 200 talks by Sheen available in MP3 format, along with streaming video of his Family Retreat
Time cover, Fulton J. Sheen, April 14, 1952
Fulton J. Sheen Spiritual Centre – El Paso, IL 

1895 births
1979 deaths
20th-century Roman Catholic bishops in the United States
20th-century venerated Christians
American anti-communists
American Roman Catholic religious writers
American television evangelists
American people of Irish descent
20th-century American Roman Catholic titular archbishops
American venerated Catholics
Anti-Masonry
Burials at St. Patrick's Cathedral (Manhattan)
Catholic television
Catholic University of America alumni
Catholic University of America faculty
Catholic University of Leuven (1834–1968) alumni
Catholics from Illinois
Christian writers
Emmy Award winners
Knights of the Holy Sepulchre
Participants in the Second Vatican Council
People from El Paso, Illinois
People from Peoria, Illinois
Pontifical University of Saint Thomas Aquinas alumni
Religious mass media in the United States
Roman Catholic bishops in New York (state)
Roman Catholic Diocese of Rochester
Saint Paul Seminary School of Divinity alumni
St. Viator College alumni
Venerated Catholics by Pope Benedict XVI
Writers from Illinois
Writers from New York City